Vindrac-Alayrac is a commune in the Tarn department in southern France.

Geography
The commune is traversed by the Cérou river. Cordes-Vindrac station has rail connections to Toulouse, Figeac and Aurillac.

See also
Communes of the Tarn department

References

Communes of Tarn (department)